Salting Earth is the twentieth studio album by guitarist/vocalist Richie Kotzen published in 2017 by Headroom Inc.

Track listing

Personnel
 Richie Kotzen – all instruments
 Julia Lage - additional vocals on 'Make It Easy'

References
 https://www.allmusic.com/album/salting-earth-mw0003018435
 http://bluesrockreview.com/2017/04/richie-kotzen-salting-earth-review.html
 https://crypticrock.com/richie-kotzen-salting-earth-album-review/
 https://www.musicconnection.com/music-album-review-richie-kotzen-salting-earth-810/
 https://guitarexperienceradioshow.com/2018/03/16/critica-richie-kotzen-salting-earth/
 http://www.decibelgeek.com/wordpress/richie-kotzen-salting-earth-album-review/

2017 albums
Richie Kotzen albums